Tropidion carinicolle is a species of beetle in the family Cerambycidae. It was described by Henry Walter Bates in 1872.

References

Tropidion
Beetles described in 1872